Sadun Sheykh Mohammad (also Romanized as Sa’dūn Sheykh Moḩammad; also known as Shaikh Mohammad-e Yeké Sádoon, Sheykh Mohammad, and Sheykh Moḩammad-e Yek) is a village in Esmailiyeh Rural District, in the Central District of Ahvaz County, Khuzestan Province, Iran. At the 2006 census, its population was 95, in 17 families.

References 

Populated places in Ahvaz County